Sipyəreğon (also, Sipyərəğon, Spyereqon, Sipyəregon, Spiragun, and Syl’yaregon) is a village and municipality in the Lerik Rayon of Azerbaijan.  It has a population of 202.

References 

Populated places in Lerik District